One Ayala is an under construction mixed-use development developed by Ayala Land Inc. located at Ayala Center in Makati, across the Glorietta mall and occupying the former InterContinental Manila and EDSA Carpark sites. This development combines retail, hotel, and office facilities in a single contiguous space. Construction began in 2016, with the demolition of InterContinental Manila and EDSA Carpark and parts of the development opened in 2022.

History
One Ayala occupies the site where the InterContinental Manila hotel and EDSA Carpark once stood. The InterContinental hotel was planned to close around 2014, where plans to build a mixed-use development in the hotel's place was also publicized. It was envisioned as part of Ayala Land's  redevelopment of the Makati Central Business District. The hotel would cease operations on December 31, 2015, and was demolished.

The mixed used development would be named after its address 1 Ayala Avenue. It is a  transport-oriented development which features two office towers, a condominium-for-lease building, a hotel, and a five-level  mall and transportation hub, seamlessly integrating to existing developments within the area.

The Point-to-Point (P2P) Bus Terminal opened on July 18, 2022, while the EDSA Carousel stop and additional bus bays opened on November 18, 2022.

Features

Mall and transport hub

The transport hub at the Upper Ground Level of the complex is currently served by the southbound Ayala Station of the EDSA Carousel, along with the terminus of other city buses going to southern Metro Manila, Laguna and Cavite, all accessible through EDSA. A terminal or bus stop for P2P buses going to different parts of Metro Manila, Laguna, and Rizal is situated at the Ayala Avenue side of the development.

A jeepney and UV Express terminal will be located at the Lower Ground Level and will be used starting on March 20, 2023. The Level 2 walkways and bridges connect the transport hub to the McKinley Exchange Corporate Center where the EDSA-Ayala terminal of BGC Bus is located, the northbound Ayala Station of the EDSA Carousel situated beside the building, and to the Ayala station of the MRT Line 3.

Within the transport hub is a five-storey mall managed by Ayala Malls, which is set to fully open in the fourth quarter of 2023. It is expected to feature a trade hall and a multi-purpose court at Level 5 and a Robinsons Supermarket branch.

Office towers

One Ayala Tower 1 (also known as the One Ayala West Tower) is already operational, whereas One Ayala Tower 2 (also known as the One Ayala East Tower) is expected to top off in 2024. One of its major tenants is the Philippine headquarters of Microsoft, which moved from its 6750 Ayala Avenue space to One Ayala Tower 1 in 2022.

Hotel and condominium
One Ayala will host a Seda Hotels branch and a condominium building.

Intended to be a flagship project, the Seda One Ayala will have 413 rooms. It is set to open in 2024.

See also
 Makati Central Business District
 List of shopping malls in Metro Manila

References

Ayala Malls
Bus stations in Metro Manila
Buildings and structures in Makati
Buildings and structures under construction in Metro Manila
Makati Central Business District
Office buildings in Metro Manila
Shopping malls in Metro Manila
Skyscraper office buildings in the Philippines
Skyscrapers in Makati